Inertial inflation is a situation in which all prices in an economy are continuously adjusted with relation to a price index by force of contracts.

Changes in price indices trigger changes in prices of goods. Contracts are made to accommodate the price-changing scenario by means of indexation. Indexation in a high-inflation economy is evident when, for instance, a given price must be recalculated later to incorporate inflation accumulated over the period to "correct" the price. In other cases, local currency prices can be expressed in terms of a foreign currency. At some point in the future, prices are converted back from the foreign currency equivalent into local currency. The conversion from a "stronger" currency equivalent value, the foreign currency, is intended to protect the real value of goods, as the nominal value depreciates.

In the medium and long terms, economic agents begin to forecast inflation and to use those forecasts as de facto price indexes that can trigger price adjustments before the actual price indices are made known to the public. That cycle of forecast-price adjustment-forecast closes itself in the form of a feedback loop, and inflation indices get beyond control since current inflation becomes the basis for future inflation (more formally, economic agents start to adjust prices solely based on their expectations of future inflation). At worst, inflation tends to grow exponentially and leads to hyperinflation.

See also
 1972 Chile is an example of another positive feedback mechanism in inflation, through the fiscal deficit/black economy channel
 Hyperinflation has an overview of uncontrollable inflation causes.

External links
  Excerpts from a speech given by Federal Reserve Governor Ben S. Bernanke on indexation and structuralism.
  A paper by former Brazilian Minister of Finances Luiz Carlos Bresser-Pereira on the developments of the inertial inflation theory by Brazilian economists and the theoretical basis of the Plano Cruzado.
  While "Structural inflation" gives a monetary policy cause for inflation, the "Structuralism" school argues that non-monetary causes dominate.

Inflation